Hilde Jøtun Bråthen (born 7 July 1958 in Oslo) is a former Norwegian curler.

Teams

References

External links
 

Living people
1958 births
Sportspeople from Oslo
Norwegian female curlers
Norwegian curling champions